Reethigowla, Reethi Gowla or Reethigowlai is a janya raga in carnatic music. It is associated with 22nd melakarta raga Kharaharapriya.

It is Vakra Shadava-Sampoorna (Zig-zag raga with six notes in Arohana and seven in Avarohana). It is a Rakthi Ragam with unique and melodious Sancharams and Prayogams. This Raga invokes Bhakti mixed with immense joy through a Vadi-Samvadi relationship between many of its swaras such as Sa-Ma, Ri-Dha and Ga-Ni. It is also classified as a "rakti" raga (a raga of high melodic content). In the Muthuswami Dikshitar school, it is a melakarta known as Nārīrītigowla.

Arohana and Avarohana

 : 
 :

Popular compositions 
Seetha Nayaka by Tyagaraja
Bale balendu-bhushani by Tyagaraja
Nannu vidachi by Tyagaraja
Jo Jo Jo Rama by Tyagaraja
Badalika teera by Tyagaraja
Dvaitamu sukhama by Tyagaraja
Paripalaya paripalaya raghunatha by Tyagaraja
Raaga ratna malikache by Tyagaraja
Chera rava demira by Tyagaraja
Thamboolava Kollu By Purandara Dasa
Janani Ninnuvina by Subbaraya Sastri
Guruvayurappane by Ambujam Krishna
Vrndavana-nilaye radhe , enna punniyam seidenoby Oothukkadu Venkata Kavi
Malarinai thunai , tattvamariya tarama by Papanasam Sivan
Mama hrdaye vihara dayalo by Mysore Vasudevacharya
Pari-palaya mam shri padmanabha murare by Swathi Tirunal
Ninnu vina mari galada by Shyama shastri
Sri jnana-skandam bhavaye by Swami Haridas giri
Kamakoti-pitha sthite kamakshi by Mysore V Ramarathnam
Vanajaaksha by Veenai kuppaiyer
En taamarai en mel by GN Balasubramaniam
Tatvamariya tarama by Papanasam Sivan
Shri krishna kamalanatho by Bangalore T. Srinivas

Film Songs

Tamil Language Songs

Malayalam Language Songs

Kannada Language Songs

Notes

References

External links
 All things Reethigowla

Janya ragas
Janya ragas (kharaharapriya)